Valentin Buhăcianu (born 28 October 1993) is a Romanian professional footballer who plays as a forward for Liga I club FC Hermannstadt. In his career, Buhăcianu also played for Bucovina Pojorâta, Știința Miroslava or Aerostar Bacău, among others. He was one of the Liga III top scorers in 2016, when he played for Atletico Vaslui. He was then the top scorer of Liga II at the end of the 2018–19 season, and the second top scorer at the end of the 2019–20 season.

Honours
Bucovina Pojorâta
Liga III: 2014–15
UTA Arad
Liga II: 2019–20
Individual
Liga II top scorer: 2018–19

References

External links
 
 

1993 births
Living people
People from Vatra Dornei
Romanian footballers
Association football forwards
Liga I players
Liga II players
Liga III players
FC UTA Arad players
CS Știința Miroslava players
CS Aerostar Bacău players
FC Hermannstadt players